The 2016 United States presidential election in Illinois was held on Tuesday, November 8, 2016, as part of the 2016 United States presidential election in which all 50 states plus the District of Columbia participated. Illinois voters chose electors to represent them in the Electoral College via a popular vote, pitting the Republican Party's nominee, businessman Donald Trump, and running mate Indiana Governor Mike Pence against Democratic Party nominee, former Secretary of State Hillary Clinton, and her running mate Virginia Senator Tim Kaine. Illinois has 20 votes in the Electoral College.

Illinois was won by Clinton, who garnered 55.83% of the votes cast against Trump's 38.76%, thus winning the state by a margin of 17.07%. Prior to the election, news organizations accurately predicted that the state would be carried by Clinton, who was born in Illinois. Clinton won by a slightly wider margin than Barack Obama in 2012, making it one of eleven states in which she outperformed Obama's 2012 margin; however, due to an increase in third-party voting, her overall percentage of the vote was lower than Obama's in both his runs. Trump flipped eleven counties red, although all of them have small populations; the most populous of them, Whiteside County, has under 60,000 residents. He also became the first Republican ever to win the White House without carrying DeKalb, DuPage, Kane, Lake, Will, or Winnebago Counties.

Clinton's victory continued a Democratic winning streak in the state, with the candidate having carried Illinois through the past seven consecutive elections. The last Republican to win Illinois in a presidential election was George H. W. Bush in 1988.

Primaries
Presidential primary elections for three parties were held in Illinois. From January 25 to February 17, 2016, the Green Party of the United States held primaries and caucuses, as part of the Green Party presidential primaries, to elect delegates representing a candidate at the 2016 Green National Convention. Physician and activist Jill Stein won a landslide of the popular vote, taking almost all of the state's 23 delegates. On March 15, 2016, both the Democratic and Republican parties held primaries in Illinois as part of a five-state contest being held on the day in both the Democratic and Republican presidential primaries. In the Democratic primaries, 156 pledged delegates to the 2016 Democratic National Convention were elected and awarded to candidates proportionally, according to countywide and statewide vote. In the Republican primaries, 69 delegates to the 2016 Republican National Convention were elected and awarded to the first place candidate, according to statewide vote.

Democratic

The 2016 Illinois Democratic presidential primary was held on March 15, 2016 in the U.S. state of Illinois as one of the Democratic Party's state primaries ahead of the 2016 presidential election.

Forum
March 14, 2016 – Columbus, Ohio, and Springfield, Illinois:
The tenth forum was held at 6:00 pm EDT on March 14, 2016, at the campus of Ohio State University in Columbus, Ohio, and at the Old State Capitol State Historic Site (Illinois) in Springfield, Illinois. It aired on MSNBC. The first section of the town hall with Bernie Sanders was moderated by Chuck Todd; the second section of the town hall with Hillary Clinton was moderated by Chris Matthews.

Results
Six candidates appeared on the Democratic presidential primary ballot:

Republican

The 2016 Illinois Republican presidential primary was held on March 15, 2016 in the U.S. state of Illinois as one of the Republican Party's state primaries ahead of the 2016 presidential election.

Ten candidates appeared on the Republican presidential primary ballot:

Green

The 2016 Illinois Green Party presidential primary was held from January 25 through February 17 in the U.S. state of Illinois as one of the Green Party's state primaries ahead of the 2016 presidential election. It was run by the Green Party of Illinois. Illinois' primary was the first to be held of the series of presidential primaries held by the Green Party of the United States. Registered Green party voters could participate in the primary through an online ballot or at select caucus sites in the state on various dates. 23 delegates to the 2016 Green National Convention were up for election in this primary.

Five candidates stood for election, including a sixth "uncommitted" option for the ballot. The candidates included activist and Green nominee in the 2012 presidential election, Jill Stein, singer-songwriter Darryl Cherney, businesswoman Sedinam Moyowasifza-Curry, perennial candidate Kent Mesplay, and professor William "Bill" Kreml. By the end of the primary, 134 votes were cast, with Stein winning a landslide 89% of the vote. 20 delegates from Illinois to the convention were allocated to Stein following the primary, with 1 being allocated to William Kreml and 2 being sent as uncommitted delegates.

General election

Predictions

Polling

Results

Turnout

For the state-run primaries (Democratic and Republican), turnout was 45.73%, with 3,505,795 votes cast. For the general election, turnout was 68.95%, with 5,536,424 votes cast.

By county

Counties that flipped from Democratic to Republican

 Alexander (largest city: Cairo)
 Carroll (largest city: Savanna)
 Fulton (largest city: Canton)
 Henderson (largest village: Oquawka)
 Henry (largest city: Kewanee)
 Jo Daviess (largest city: Galena)
 Knox (largest city: Galesburg)
 Mercer (largest city: Aledo)
 Putnam (largest village: Granville)
 Warren (largest city: Monmouth)
 Whiteside (largest city: Sterling)

By congressional district
Clinton won 11 of 18 congressional districts, both candidates won a district held by the other party.

Analysis
Clinton's win in Illinois was largely the result of a lopsided victory in Cook County, the state's most populous county and home of Chicago, the city where Clinton was born and raised. Trump meanwhile won most of the downstate rural counties by large margins. Many of these counties had voted for Clinton's husband in both his 1992 and 1996 presidential runs. This is also the first presidential election in history where a Republican managed to win the White House nationally without carrying any of Chicago's collar counties aside from McHenry County, which is more Republican-leaning than the other four collar counties. Illinois, along with Minnesota, was one of the only two Midwestern states not won by Donald Trump. The election marked the first time since 1988 in which Illinois did not vote the same as neighboring Wisconsin, and the first time since 1960 when the Democratic candidate won Illinois, while losing Wisconsin.

Cook County, the collar counties and the downstate counties of Champaign and McLean were the only ones to swing towards Clinton. Knowing these statistics, if one were to subtract Cook County's total votes from the rest of Illinois, Trump would have won the state with 1,692,728 votes to Clinton's 1,478,783 votes. This is the first time the Republicans have won Alexander County since Richard Nixon's 1972 landslide, as well as the first time they have won Fulton, Henderson, Knox, Mercer, and Putnam Counties since Ronald Reagan's 1984 landslide. Peoria County matched the national popular vote this year, as it did in the 2012 election.

Had Clinton won the election, she would have become the second president born in Illinois after Ronald Reagan. But like Reagan, both politicians jump-started their political careers in elected office elsewhere. Reagan served as Governor of California while Clinton served as a United States Senator from New York.

See also
 United States presidential elections in Illinois
 2016 Democratic Party presidential debates and forums
 2016 Democratic Party presidential primaries
 2016 Republican Party presidential debates and forums
 2016 Republican Party presidential primaries
 2016 Donald Trump Chicago rally protest

References

External links
 RNC 2016 Republican Nominating Process 
 Green papers for 2016 primaries, caucuses, and conventions
 Decision Desk Headquarter Results for Illinois

IL
2016
Presidential